The Ministry of Education and Science of Ukraine is the main body in the system of central bodies of the executive power of Ukraine.

History
On 28 June 1917 Ivan Steshenko was appointed Secretary of Education in the First Vynnychenko government of the Ukrainian People's Republic. The 1921 Treaty of Riga formerly ended the existence of the Ukrainian People's Republic as its former territory became part of Poland and the Soviet Union.

The modern Ministry of Education was created on July 8, 1992 by merging two major organs of the Ukrainian SSR: the Ministry of Higher and Middle Specialized Education and State Committee on Vocational-Technical Education. In 1991 there were two ministries of education — National and Higher (formerly Higher and Middle Specialized).

From 9 December 2010 until 28 February 2013 the Ministry of Education and Science (at the time led by Dmytro Tabachnyk) was merged with the Ministry of Youth and Sports.

On 28 February 2013 President Viktor Yanukovych reorganized the Ministry of Education and Science, Youth and Sports and the State Service for Youth and Sports, creating the  Ministry of Education and Science of Ukraine and the Ministry of Youth and Sports.

Structure 
The ministry consists of the central body headed by the minister, first deputy, and other deputies to assist the minister. Part of ministry elects several state administrations representatives that are specialized in certain field and coordinate operation of government companies.

State agencies
 State Service for intellectual property of Ukraine
 State Agency of Science, Innovations, and Informativeness of Ukraine

Former agencies
 Ministry of Education and Science, Youth and Sports of Ukraine (dissolved) (2010-2013)

List of Ministers 

Liubomyra Mandziy was appointed as Acting Education and Science Minister of Ukraine on 25 March 2020. On 25 June 2020 Serhiy Shkarlet was appointed acting Minister. Parliament dismissed Shkarlet as minister on 20 March 2023.

See also
Cabinet of Ministers of Ukraine
National Academy of Sciences of Ukraine

References

External links 
 Official Website of the Ukrainian Ministry of Education 
 Official Website. Contact Us. Phone and address directory. 
 Study in Ukraine for International Students 

Education
Education
Ukraine, Education
1992 establishments in Ukraine
Ministry of Education (Ukraine)
Ukraine
Ukraine
Ukraine
Ukraine